"Me So Horny" is a song by the rap group 2 Live Crew on their album As Nasty as They Wanna Be. The explicit nature of the lyrics of this song and the album led to the initially successful prosecution of the group on obscenity charges and the album being banned from sale in Florida. This ban was overturned on appeal.

It reached number one on the U.S. Billboard Hot Rap Tracks chart and number 26 on the U.S. Billboard Hot 100 in 1989, staying on the Hot 100 for thirty weeks, despite lack of airplay due to the controversial nature of the lyrics (and/or possibly because of the associated controversy). The song also reached number one in the Netherlands.

The song samples music from the 1979 hit song "Firecracker" by Mass Production and dialogue from the Richard Pryor film Which Way Is Up? and the Stanley Kubrick film Full Metal Jacket.

Samples
The song heavily samples the 1979 funk hit single "Firecracker" by Mass Production. It also features lines from two different films:

Which Way Is Up? (1977) – The "Gonna do that thing. What we gonna do? Oh sock it to me. [moaning]" sample heard at the beginning of the song (and occasionally sampled throughout) is from the scene in which Leroy (Richard Pryor) listens in on his father Rufus (also played by Pryor) having sex in another room.

Full Metal Jacket (1987) – The lines listed below were sampled from the scene in which Private Joker (Matthew Modine) and Private Rafterman (Kevyn Major Howard) are approached by a Da Nang prostitute (Papillon Soo Soo). The exchange between Joker and the prostitute is used at the beginning, while the "Me so horny. Me love you long time. Me sucky sucky" sample is used in the chorus and throughout the song. Nancy Sinatra's "These Boots Are Made for Walkin'" can be heard underneath the samples at the beginning and end; that song appeared in the original scene in the movie.
Da Nang prostitute: Well, baby, me so horny. Me so horny. Me love you long time. Me sucky sucky.

[later in the same dialogue exchange]
Private Joker: What'll we get for ten dollars?
Da Nang prostitute: Every t'ing you want.
Private Joker: Everything?
Da Nang prostitute: Every t'ing.

The "Me So Horny" sample was also featured three years later, when Sir Mix-a-Lot included the sample in "Baby Got Back".

Success and controversy
The song became a major hit for 2 Live Crew, topping the rap charts and going to No. 26 on the Billboard Hot 100 in 1989. As Nasty as They Wanna Be reached No. 3 on the rap album charts and No. 29 on the album chart. The album eventually sold millions of copies.  Because of the controversy, the song's title was never mentioned by Shadoe Stevens when he played the song on the radio show  American Top 40, though it did get mentioned on a Summer 1990 episode when the group's second top 40 hit, Banned in the U.S.A. was on the chart.

The success of the single and the album led to concern over the explicit nature of rap lyrics both by 2 Live Crew and by gangsta rappers such as Geto Boys, Ice-T and N.W.A.

Then-Broward County prosecutor Jack Thompson prosecuted 2 Live Crew on obscenity charges and persuaded a Federal District judge to declare the album obscene in June 1990. 2 Live Crew performed songs from the album including "Me So Horny" and were prosecuted for obscenity. Record store clerks who sold copies of the album were also arrested.

Henry Louis Gates, Jr. testified on behalf of the group during the trial. The decision was later overturned on appeal and the ruling was upheld by the US Supreme Court. The publicity from the trials led to further sales of the album.

In 1999, the group, minus former bandleader Luther Campbell, rerecorded the song as "Bill So Horny" during the impeachment of U.S. President Bill Clinton for perjury under oath about his relationship with Monica Lewinsky. However, the remix failed to chart.

In 2008, it was ranked number 83 on VH1's 100 Greatest Songs of Hip Hop.

Chart performance

Weekly charts

Year-end charts

Music video
The music video mainly features the members of the band rapping while scantily clad women are shown dancing on a stage.

Two versions of the video were ultimately released. The original "uncut" version featured the dancing women in G-string bikini bottoms (with rotoscoped black squares placed over the women's buttocks) and sport brassieres. The MTV version featured alternative lyrics for the song (to comply with MTV's standards and practices) and alternative footage of the dancers in cycling shorts instead of bikinis.

Covers and re-mixes
 American industrial metal act Revolting Cocks covered the song on their 2010 longplayer Got Cock?. The album also included a remix of the track.
 Andy LaPlegua of Combichrist made an EBM version of the song for his solo album "13 Ways to Masturbate" released under the moniker of Dj Scandy.
An interpolation of the song can be heard on the track Kitty Kat from the mixtape Something for Thee Hotties by American rap artist Megan Thee Stallion.
The M.I.A. song "10 Dollar" (from Arular) features an interpolation of the refrain: "What can I get for ten dollar? Every/any-ting you want"

Parodies
 A comedy hip-hop duo known as 2 Live Jews (whose name is an obvious parody of 2 Live Crew) released a spoof of the song, called "Oy! It's So Humid". This spoof replaces the line, "Me love you long time" with "It's like a sauna in here." This is one of the tracks of their first album, titled As Kosher As They Wanna Be.
 Richard Cheese and Lounge Against the Machine did a Lounge cover on the 2005 album, Aperitif for Destruction.
 A parody group known as "MC Pillsberry & the 4 Large Crew (aka Too Large Crew)" made a spoof of the song called, "Me So Hungry". This title was also used for a similar spoof by 3 Local Boyz.
 The parody music video "Me Want Maury" on the January 19, 1992 third-season episode of In Living Color mocked Maury Povich (Jim Carrey) and Connie Chung's (Steve Park) attempts to conceive a child.
 The South Park episode "Cow Days" contains Eric Cartman saying the lines "Me love you long time. Me sucky sucky."

See also
Dirty rap
Miami bass

References

External links
 Music video for the song on MTV.com
 Allmusic article
 Boston Review article on obscenity trial
 NME article on obscenity trial
 MTV Article on release of "Bill So Horny"
 Anecdotage article on trial

1989 songs
2 Live Crew songs
Obscenity controversies in music
Funk-rap songs
Dutch Top 40 number-one singles
Songs about telephone calls
Luke Records singles